Stephen Arthur Perkins (born 3 October 1954 in Stepney, Greater London) is an English former professional footballer who played in the Football League, as a left back.

Perkins was the manager of Lingfield in the Sussex County League, during the second half of the 2009–10 campaign.

References

1954 births
Living people
Footballers from Stepney
English footballers
Association football defenders
Chelsea F.C. players
Queens Park Rangers F.C. players
Wimbledon F.C. players
Wealdstone F.C. players
English Football League players
National League (English football) players